Macroglossum insipida, the hermit hummingbird hawkmoth, is a moth of the family Sphingidae. It was described by Arthur Gardiner Butler in 1875.

Distribution 
It is known from Sri Lanka, southern and eastern India, Nepal, Thailand, southern China, Taiwan, Japan (Ryukyu Archipelago), Vietnam, Malaysia (Peninsular, Sarawak), Indonesia (Sumatra, Java, Kalimantan), Papua New Guinea and Queensland.

Description
The wingspan is 40–54 mm. Head and thorax are grey with a rufus line on the vertex. Abdomen greyish with yellow lateral bands on 2nd, 3rd, and 4th segments, and paired dark spots on the vertex. There are some darker marks on terminal segments. Anal tufts are greyish at base and black tipped. Thorax pale brown. Forewings are greyish with two indistinct subbasal lines. Antemedial is a curved dark band. Subapical markings are prominent and continue towards outer angle as a submarginal line. Hindwings have a yellow band constricted at middle. Ventral side of hindwings is with three transverse lines, of which there are traces on forewing as well. Larva pale red with purplish dots. A pale subdorsal line runs with dark margins. Dark lateral oblique stripes can be seen from 3rd to 10th somites. Horn is black. In the early instars, the larva is dull brown.

Ecology
Adults fly deep within bushes to reach nectiferous flowers, particularly those of Duranta erecta. They are active at dawn and dusk. Adults have light and dark brown forewings, and yellow and black hindwings. Larvae have been recorded feeding on Hedyotis hydyotidea and Hedyotis acutangulata in Hong Kong, Hedyotis uncinella and Hedyotis scandens in India, as well as Spermacoce hispida, Borreria and Corchorus capsularis. The larvae are green initially, but the last instar is sometimes brown, with diagonal dark stripes and white speckles. All instars have a spine on the tail. They grow to a length of about 50 mm.

Subspecies
Macroglossum insipida insipida
Macroglossum insipida papuanum Rothschild & Jordan, 1903 (Papua New Guinea and Queensland)

References

External links
The life history of the hawk moth macroglossum insipida papuanum rothschild & Jordan,1903(Lepidoptera: Sphingidae)

Macroglossum
Moths described in 1875
Moths of Asia